The Strongman Mine was an underground coal mine north of Greymouth on the West Coast of New Zealand from 1938 to 2003.

On 19 January 1967 a gas explosion in the mine killed 19 miners.

In 1994 the original mine was replaced by the Strongman 2 mine further up the Nine Mile valley. The Strongman 2 mine closed in 2003.

See also
 Mining in New Zealand
 Mining accident
 Brunner Mine disaster
 Pike River Mine disaster

References

External links
Strongman Mine Disaster at the Christchurch City Libraries
  
 

Coal mines in New Zealand
Underground mines in New Zealand
Buildings and structures in the West Coast, New Zealand